The 2014 United States House of Representatives elections in Kansas was held on Tuesday, November 4, 2014 to elect the four U.S. representatives from the state of Kansas, one from each of the state's four congressional districts. The elections will coincide with the elections of other federal and state offices, including the 2014 Kansas gubernatorial election.

Overview

By district
Results of the 2014 United States House of Representatives elections in Kansas by district:

District 1

Republican Tim Huelskamp has represented the district since being elected in 2010. Huelskamp was re-elected in 2012 with 100% of the vote, as no candidate filed to run against him.

Alan LaPolice, a former school administrator, lost against incumbent Huelskamp in the Republican primary. 

Jim Sherow, city co-commissioner and former mayor of Manhattan, successfully received the Democratic nomination, defeating Bryan Whitney, a member of the 2013 class of Wichita State University who hardly campaigned.

Unlike the other three congressional districts in Kansas, none of the candidates received endorsements from the local Kansas Farm Bureau and Kansas Livestock Association. The president of the Farm Bureau described this inability to endorse candidates as "reflect[ing] views at the grassroots level."

Republican primary

Candidates

Nominee
 Tim Huelskamp, incumbent U.S. Representative

Eliminated in primary
 Alan LaPolice, former school administrator

Withdrawn
 Kent Roth, attorney and former state representative

Endorsements

Polling

 ^ Poll for the Tim Huelskamp campaign

Results

Democratic primary

Candidates

Nominee
 Jim Sherow, history professor at Kansas State University and former mayor of Manhattan

Eliminated in primary
 Bryan Whitney, college student

Results

General election

Endorsements

Polling

Results

District 2

Republican Lynn Jenkins has represented the district since being elected in 2008.

Family law attorney Margie Wakefield is running for the Democratic nomination. 6th grade life science teacher Chris Clemmons is running as a Libertarian.

Republican primary

Candidates

Nominee
 Lynn Jenkins, incumbent U.S. Representative

Eliminated in primary
 Joshua Joel Tucker, computer systems analyst and conservative activist

Results

Democratic primary

Candidates

Nominee
 Margie Wakefield, former congressional aide, Douglas County Democratic Chair, and attorney

Libertarian primary

Candidates

Nominee
 Chris Clemmons

General election

Endorsements

Polling

Predictions

Results

District 3

Republican Kevin Yoder has represented the district since being elected in 2010.

Former state senator Kelly Kultala is running for the Democrats.

Republican primary

Candidates

Nominee
 Kevin Yoder, incumbent U.S. Representative

Democratic primary

Candidates

Nominee
 Kelly Kultala, former state senator and nominee for lieutenant governor in 2010

Eliminated in primary
 Reggie Marselus, retired union official

Results

General election

Endorsements

Polling

Predictions

Results

District 4

Republican Mike Pompeo has represented the district since being elected in 2010. Former Congressman Todd Tiahrt, who represented the district from 1995 until he gave up the seat in 2010 to unsuccessfully run for the U.S. Senate, challenged Pompeo in the Republican primary.

Republican primary

Candidates

Nominee
 Mike Pompeo, incumbent U.S. Representative

Eliminated in primary
 Todd Tiahrt, former U.S. Representative and candidate for Senate in 2010

Polling

Results

Democratic primary

Candidates

Nominee
 Perry Schuckman

Declined
Robert Tillman, retired court officer, Kansas National Guard veteran, candidate for this seat in 2010 and nominee in 2012

General election

Endorsements

Polling

Results

References

External links
U.S. House elections in Kansas, 2014 at Ballotpedia
Campaign contributions at OpenSecrets

Kansas
2014
United States House